Morelía Airport  is an airport serving the Morelía oil field and production facility  southeast of Puerto Gaitán in the Meta Department of Colombia.

See also

Transport in Colombia
List of airports in Colombia

References

External links
OpenStreetMap - Morelía
OurAirports - Morelía
Morelía Airport

Airports in Colombia